Lauer is a river of Bavaria, Germany. It flows into the Franconian Saale in Niederlauer.

See also
List of rivers of Bavaria

References

Rivers of Bavaria
Rivers of Germany
Rhön-Grabfeld
Bad Kissingen (district)
Schweinfurt (district)